Teatrul Tineretului (Youth's Theatre) is a cultural institution and a landmark of the city of Piatra Neamț, Romania. It is one of the most well-known theaters in Romania since many important Romanian actors began their career here.   For over 50 years, Teatrul Tineretului has been a major cultural institution in Romania.

History
Nevertheless, achieving this status wasn't easy. After World War II, theaters in Romania, like many other cultural institutions, lacked funding and most importantly, help and understanding from the ruling Communist Party. Ion Coman, appointed manager of the theater by the new post-war rulers, unlike most political appointees of that time, loved theater and fell in love with the institution and its people. Ion Coman became overnight, a talent agent, searching for actors, newly graduates of drama schools throughout the country. He encouraged young actors to come to Piatra Neamț, and using his personal connections with the Communist Party, arranged for the newcomers a commodity that few other institutions of that time offered, housing for the young actors.

The first generation of actors that put TT in the spotlight included Florin Piersic, Leopoldina Balanuta and Radu (Dodo) Voicescu.
Later on, they were followed by Mitica Popescu, Valentin Uritescu, Ileana Stana-Ionescu, Horațiu Mălăele, Gelu Nitu, Florian Pittis, Corneliu Dan Borcia, Florin (Pufi) Macelaru, Ion Musca, Traian Parlog, Mimi Caragiu, Maia Morgenstern, Cornel Nicoara, Liviu Timus, Coca Blos, Oana Albu, Constantin Ghenescu, Cristian Motriuc, and many others.

After Ion Coman's tenure ended, managers that followed him continued the same wonderful tradition of encouraging young actors to come to Piatra Neamț. Among them, Edi Covali (director and writer), Emil Mandric (director), Nicolae Scarlat (director), Mircea Zaharia, Dan Borcia (actor), Cornel Nicoara (actor), Liviu Timus (actor) and the current manager, Gianina Cărbunariu (director and writer).

External links
Official site

Piatra Neamț
Theatres in Romania
Buildings and structures in Neamț County
Youth theatre companies
Tourist attractions in Neamț County